Kam Shan may refer to several places in Hong Kong:

 Kam Shan Country Park
 Kam Shan, also known as Golden Hill, a hill within Kam Shan Country Park
 Kam Shan, Tai Po District, an area including and around Kam Shan Village, in Tai Po District